The Molesworth Gallery is a contemporary art gallery in Dublin.

It is one of Ireland's leading contemporary art galleries, representing some of the most acclaimed artists working in the country today. It hosts eight solo and two curated group exhibitions annually at its gallery space in Dublin's city centre. Exhibitions are documented in gallery publications ranging from brochures to hardback books. It also collaborates with arts centres and museums to maximise public access to the work of its artists, as well as promoting them at international art fairs. 
The gallery covers the ground and first floors of a large Georgian house. A changing display of work by gallery artists may be viewed in its upstairs exhibition space

Artists
 Catherine Barron
 Robert Bates
 Michael Beirne
Shane Berkery
 Helen Blake
 John Boyd
 Cristina Bunello
 J.P. Donleavy
 Gabhann Dunne
 Conor Foy
 Mercedes Helnwein
 Ronnie Hughes
 John Kindness
 Vera Klute ARHA
 Gillian Lawler
 Francis Matthews
 Maeve McCarthy RHA
 Cian McLoughlin
 Sean Molloy
 Sheila Pomeroy
 Gareth Reid

Photo gallery

External links
 Gallery website
 Dictionary of Living Artists by Robert O' Byrne

Notes

Art galleries established in 1999
1999 establishments in Ireland
Galleries in Dublin (city)